Tomi Rahula (born 3 November 1976) is an Estonian musician and football referee.

He is the chief producer of Eesti Laul.

He has been a member of the bands The Sun and Outloudz.

He is also a football referee with A-licence.

References

Living people
1976 births
Estonian musicians
Estonian football referees